The LIU Sharks men's ice hockey statistical leaders are individual statistical leaders of the LIU Sharks men's ice hockey program in various categories, including goals, assists, points, and saves. Within those areas, the lists identify single-game, single-season, and career leaders. The Sharks represent Long Island University as an independent in the NCAA.

LIU began competing in intercollegiate ice hockey in 2020.  These lists are updated through the end of the 2020–21 season.

Goals

Assists

Points

Saves

References

Lists of college ice hockey statistical leaders by team